Betampona (near Marolambo) is a rural commune located in the Atsinanana region of eastern Madagascar.  It belongs to the Marolambo District.

See also
Betampona Reserve

References

Populated places in Atsinanana